Spiralisigna is a genus of moths in the family Geometridae.

Species
Spiralisigna angusta Hausmann & Skou, 2008
Spiralisigna acidna (Turner, 1904)
Spiralisigna gloriae Galsworthy, 1999
Spiralisigna minutissima (Swinhoe, 1902)
Spiralisigna pseudofluctuosa (Holloway, 1979)
Spiralisigna subpumilata (Inoue, 1972)

References

External links
Natural History Museum Lepidoptera genus database

Eupitheciini